"Heaven" is a song by alternative rock group Live, which was released as the first single from their 2003 album, Birds of Pray.

Background
The song was not released as a commercial CD single in the United States, but was made available as a purchasable digital download, which enabled the song to reach #59 on the Billboard Hot 100 chart.  The song also reached #56 on Billboard's Hot 100 Airplay chart, and peaked at #33 on both the Billboard Modern Rock Tracks and Mainstream Rock Tracks charts. It was also a hit in Australia, Brazil,  New Zealand, The Netherlands and Belgium.

The video, considered a "concept" video, as it featured highly symbolical imagery without the participation of the band, depicts a young girl and a boy at the opposite sides of a river who want to cross it, so they can be together. They plan to meet in a place where the boy thinks he can swim to the other side, but he is taken by the stream and carried away. The girl swims to him and they are finally together, but soon they realize they are heading to the tumultuous river waterfalls. Whether they survive or not is unknown. The video was shot in Iceland and its supposed religious symbolism is open to different interpretations.

After the song became a success in the United States, the original video was replaced in most rotations by a new video. Shot at Voorst National in Brussels, Belgium, this version was a high intensity performance of the song, featuring all four principal band members.

Track listings

Australian and European CD single
"Heaven" – 3:52
"Life Marches On" – 2:55
"Forever May Not Be Long Enough" (Egyptian Dreams Remix) – 4:06
"Overcome" (Live) – 4:25

Canadian CD single
"Heaven" – 3:52
"Forever May Not Be Long Enough" (Egyptian Dreams Remix) – 4:06

European 7" picture disc and CD single 2
"Heaven" – 3:52
"Forever May Not Be Long Enough" (Egyptian Dreams Remix) – 4:06

European "Special Tour Edition" CD single

U.S. digital download single

Charts

Weekly charts

Year-end charts

References

External links

Live (band) songs
2003 singles
Songs written by Ed Kowalczyk
Radioactive Records singles
2003 songs